Aldeadávila Dam is a concrete arch-gravity dam on the Duero River (also known as the Douro River) in Spain, near the border with Portugal. The Portuguese side of the river around the dam site lies within the Arribes del Duero Natural Park.

Overview
In 1864, Portugal and Spain signed the "Treaty of Limits" (ratified in 1866), which established the present international boundaries of the two nations. A treaty on transboundary rivers, clarifying issues regarding the use of such rivers, was signed and affirmed in 1912.

A treaty regulating the development of hydroelectric facilities on the Duero River was signed in 1927. The Aldeadávila Dam was built by Spain pursuant to these treaties, and was the final dam to be built by Spain on the section of river allotted to that country.

It was one of a series of very high dams built in Europe in the two decades after World War II; these were designed with a downstream face inclined toward the upstream flow. This simplified the dam's design and construction (although it required more concrete to build), and more readily incorporated the spillways into the dam face. The dam's face is nearly vertical. Design work on the dam began in 1956, and construction completed in 1963. The structure was built by the Iberdrola Ingeniería y Construcción construction firm. Pedro Martínez Artola was the design engineer. The dam was built on high-quality granite rock. During construction, grouting was used to fill cracks in the rock which ran parallel to the dam's foundation, and on the Portuguese bank where two fractures in the rock occurred.

The underground power station and tunnels were excavated using a mining procedure known as large-chamber stoping. The use of this technique for the Aldeadávila Dam is considered a textbook example. The turbine and generator hall, and the transformer hall were both cut from solid granite as well.

The structure has eight overflow gates which channel water into four spillways. The spillways incorporate side piers on the upstream face to more correctly channel water over the dam so that each spillway discharges the same amount of water. The spillways release their water slightly above the actual bed of the river, creating a waterfall effect when they are fully open. A spillway tunnel carved from granite in the right bank of the river augments the spillways and provides for additional overflow. The total spillway capacity is half that of Grand Coulee Dam in the United States. The Export-Import Bank of the United States provided $8.9 million (about $67.2 million in 2010 inflation-adjusted dollars) in credits in 1958 to Iberduero to enable it to purchase six 120 Megawatt (MW) turbines and other electrical equipment for the power generating station, all of which were supplied by American firms.

The dam won Spain an international reputation as a builder of very large dams. The dam's eye-catching, "ski jump" style spillways are its most noted feature, and have been called "outstanding" by leading dam engineers.

The canyon through which the Duero River flows is exceptionally deep and narrow, resulting in a reservoir that has a relatively small surface area for its immense size. In some ways, this limits use of the reservoir for recreational activities.  However, the Aldeadávila Dam reservoir is a popular one for boating.

Power plant
Until the Alcántara Dam, also in Spain, was built in 1969, the Aldeadávila Dam was the largest hydroelectric power plant in Europe.

During periods when the demand for electricity is low (such as evenings, weekends, or during seasonal fluctuations), the dam's two pumped-storage generators can use its excess power-generating capacity to pump water back into the reservoir—enhancing reservoir capacity and storing water for periods when the demand for electricity is high.  At the time it was constructed, the Aldeadávila Dam had the largest pumping station capacity in Europe.

The dam has two diversion tunnels, each  in length. The design of the penstocks and auxiliary spillways using these tunnels has proved to be an issue, however. Cavitation problems have damaged these tunnels in the past.

In popular culture

A 30-minute documentary about the dam, La presa de Aldeadávila, was produced by Iberduero (the power company that built the dam) in 1963. Several scenes in the 1965 David Lean film Doctor Zhivago were filmed at the Aldeadávila Dam. The dam's famous spillways were opened for the filming, and are shown in the motion picture open at full force.  Another scene depicts workers walking into one of the dam's enormous tunnels. The final scenes of Antonio Mercero's 1972 film, La cabina (The Telephone Box) were also filmed inside the dam. Terminator: Dark Fate filmed a scene at the dam.

References

External links 

 Iberdrola - Web site of the company which owns the dam
 Búrdalo, Soledad. "Geometría tectónica." La Revista del Ministerio de Fomento. Abril 2007. - Article  from The Magazine of the Ministry of Public Works and the Economy about the construction of the dam.
 Artola, Pedro Martínez. "El Salto de Aldeadávila." Revista de Obras Públicas. Diciembre 1962. - Article  by dam engineer Pedro Martínez Artola in the Journal of Public Works on the construction of the dam.
 Olaguibel, L. "La Construccion de la Presa de Aldeadávila." Revista de Obras Públicas. Abril 1964. - Article  in the Journal of Public Works on the construction of the dam.

Dams completed in 1962
Dams in Spain
Dams in Portugal
Arch-gravity dams
Buildings and structures in the Province of Salamanca
Buildings and structures in Bragança District
Portugal–Spain border
Reservoirs in Portugal
Reservoirs in Castile and León
1962 establishments in Spain
Dams on the Douro River